Mount Magdalena is a volcanic cone mountain located at the Tawau Division of Sabah, Malaysia.

History 
Since 1979, it has been a part of the Tawau Hills Park. Jungle trekking activities are served by the park where the forest trail also leads to Mount Lucia and Mount Maria.

See also 
 List of volcanoes in Malaysia

References 

Magdalena
Protected areas of Sabah
Hiking trails in Malaysia
Volcanoes of Malaysia
Extinct volcanoes
Tawau Division